T. kochii may refer to:

Tricolia kochii, a sea snail species
Trochus kochii, a sea snail species

Synonyms
Telesto kochii, a synonym of Toxidia peron, a butterfly species
Titanoeca kochii, a synonym of Titanoeca quadriguttata, a spider species